Given the vastness of the African continent, its music is diverse, with regions and nations having many distinct musical traditions. African music includes the genres amapiano, Jùjú, Fuji, Afrobeat, Highlife, Makossa, Kizomba, and others. African music also uses a large variety of instruments across the continent. The music and dance of the African diaspora, formed to varying degrees on African musical traditions, include American music like Dixieland jazz, blues, jazz, and many Caribbean genres, such as calypso (see kaiso) and soca. Latin American music genres such as salsa music, son cubano, rumba, conga, bomba, cumbia, samba and zouk were founded on the music of enslaved Africans, and have in turn influenced African popular music.

Like the music of Asia, India and the Middle East, it is a highly rhythmic music. The complex rhythmic patterns often involving one rhythm played against another to create a polyrhythm. The most common polyrhythm plays three beats on top of two, like a triplet played against straight notes. Sub-Saharan African music traditions frequently rely on percussion instruments of many varieties, including xylophones, djembes, drums, and tone-producing instruments such as the mbira or "thumb piano."

Another distinguishing form of African music is its call-and-response nature: one voice or instrument plays a short melodic phrase, and that phrase is echoed by another voice or instrument. The call-and-response nature extends to the rhythm, where one drum will play a rhythmic pattern, echoed by another drum playing the same pattern. African music is also highly improvised. A core rhythmic pattern is typically played, with drummers then improvising new patterns over the static original patterns.

Traditional music in most of the continent is passed down orally (or aurally) and is not written. There are subtle differences in pitch and intonation that do not easily translate to Western notation. African music most closely adheres to Western tetratonic (four-note), pentatonic (five-note), hexatonic (six-note), and heptatonic (seven-note) scales. Harmonization of the melody is accomplished by singing in parallel thirds, fourths, or fifths (see Traditional sub-Saharan African harmony).

Music is important to religion in Africa, where rituals and religious ceremonies use music to pass down stories from generation to generation as well as to sing and dance to. Additionally, music is important to the culture as a whole, not only as a form of religious and self expression, but also as a form of media to communicate about important demographic issues, politics, and morals.

Many other cultures has studied African music though time, hence the mass influence that it has had on others. For instance, in December of 2002, the Swiss Society for Ethnomusicology held multiple conferences in attempt to study the music of Ghana. These ethnomusicologists taking part in the study looked to learn aspects of history through music, along with traditions. Additionally, some ethnomusicologist, such as John Collins looked to study more specific aspects of music from Ghana, such has the presence if Christianity in popular music.

African Music has a deep relationship with the community. African music is made for both public enjoyment and public participation; which makes African music fall under the category of Community Music, where active community and public participation in music making is encouraged. It is this importance of community that establishes Christopher Small's idea of Social Happiness and musicking, which is wildly important in this culture.

Music by regions

North Africa and the Horn of Africa 

North Africa is the seat of ancient Egypt and Carthage, civilizations with strong ties to the ancient Near East and which influenced the ancient Greek and Roman cultures. Eventually, Egypt fell under Persian rule followed by Greek and Roman rule, while Carthage was later ruled by Romans and Vandals. North Africa was later conquered by the Arabs, who established the region as the Maghreb of the Arab world.

Like the musical genres of the Nile Valley and the Horn of Africa (sky-blue and dark green region on map), its music has close ties with Middle Eastern music and utilizes similar melodic modes (maqamat). North African music has a considerable range, from the music of ancient Egypt to the Berber and the Tuareg music of the desert nomads. The region's art music has for centuries followed the outline of Arabic and Andalusian classical music: its popular contemporary genres include the Algerian Raï.

With these may be grouped the music of Sudan and of the Horn of Africa, including the music of Eritrea, Ethiopia, Djibouti and Somalia. Somali music is typically pentatonic, using five pitches per octave in contrast to a heptatonic (seven note) scale such as the major scale. The music of the Ethiopian highlands uses a fundamental modal system called qenet, of which there are four main modes: tezeta, bati, ambassel, and anchihoy. Three additional modes are variations on the above: tezeta minor, bati major, and bati minor. Some songs take the name of their qenet, such as tizita, a song of reminiscence.

West, Central, Southeast and South Africa 

The ethnomusicological pioneer Arthur Morris Jones (1889–1980) observed that the shared rhythmic principles of Bantu African music traditions constitute one main system. Similarly, master drummer and scholar C. K. Ladzekpo affirms the "profound homogeneity" of Bantu African rhythmic principles.

African traditional music is frequently functional in nature. Performances may be long and often involve the participation of the audience. There are, for example, specialised work songs, songs accompanying childbirth, marriage, hunting and political activities, music to ward off evil spirits and to pay respects to good spirits, the dead and the ancestors. None of this is performed outside its intended social context and much of it is associated with a particular dance. Some of it, performed by professional musicians, is sacral music or ceremonial and courtly music performed at royal courts.

Musicologically, Sub-Saharan Africa may be divided into four regions:
 The eastern region (light green regions on map) includes the music of Uganda, Kenya, Rwanda, Burundi, Tanzania, Malawi, Mozambique and Zimbabwe as well as the islands of Madagascar, the Seychelles, Mauritius and Comor. Many of these have been influenced by Arabic music and also by the music of India, Indonesia and Polynesia, though the region's indigenous musical traditions are primarily in the mainstream of the Bantu/Niger–Congo-speaking peoples.
 The southern region (brown region on map) includes the music of South Africa, Lesotho, Swaziland, Botswana, Namibia and Angola.
 The central region (dark blue region on map) includes the music of Chad, the Central African Republic, the Democratic Republic of the Congo and Zambia, including Pygmy music.
 West African music (yellow region on map) includes the music of Senegal and the Gambia, of Guinea and Guinea-Bissau, Sierra Leone and Liberia, of the inland plains of Mali, Niger and Burkina Faso, the coastal nations of Cote d'Ivoire, Ghana, Togo, Benin, Nigeria, Cameroon, Gabon and the Republic of the Congo as well as islands such as Sao Tome and Principe.

Southern, Central and West Africa are similarly in the broad Sub-Saharan musical tradition. They also have several ancillary influences, from the Muslim regions of Africa, and in modern times, the Americas and Western Europe.

Afrobeat, Juju, Fuji, Highlife, Makossa, and Kizomba are performed in West Africa. West African music has regional variations, with Muslim regions incorporating elements of Islamic music and non-Muslim regions more influenced by indigenous traditions, according to the historian Sylviane Diouf and ethnomusicologist Gerhard Kubik. According to Diouf, traditional Muslim West African Music incorporates elements of the Islamic call to prayer (originating from Bilal ibn Rabah, an Abyssinian African Muslim in the early 7th century), including lyrics praising God, melody, note changes, "words that seem to quiver and shake" in the vocal chords, dramatic changes in musical scales, and nasal intonation. According to Kubik, the vocal style of Muslim West African singers "using melisma, wavy intonation, and so forth is a heritage of that large region of West Africa that had been in contact with the Arabic-Islamic world of the Maghreb since the seventh and eighth centuries." In terms of instrumentation, Kubik notes that stringed instruments (including ancestors of the banjo) were traditionally favored by Muslim West Africans, while drumming was traditionally favored by non-Muslim West Africans.

Musical instruments 

Besides vocalisation, which uses various techniques such as complex hard melisma and yodel, a wide array of musical instruments are also used. African musical instruments include a wide range of drums, slit gongs, rattles and double bells, different types of harps, and harp-like instruments such as the Kora and the ngoni,  as well as fiddles, many kinds of xylophone and lamellophone such as the mbira, and different types of wind instrument like flutes and trumpets. Additionally, string instruments are also used, with the lute-like oud and Ngoni serving as musical accompaniment in some areas.

There are five groups of Sub-Saharan African musical instruments: membranophones, chordophones, aerophones, idiophones, and percussion. Membranophones are the drums, including kettles, clay pots, and barrels. Chordophones are stringed instruments like harps and fiddles. Aerophones are another name for wind instruments. These can include flutes and trumpets, similar to the instruments you hear in American music. Idiophones are rattles and shakers, while percussion can be sounds like foot-stomping and hand-clapping. Many of the wooden instruments have shapes or pictures carved out into them to represent ancestry. Some are decorated with feathers or beads.

Drums used in African traditional music include talking drums, bougarabou and djembe in West Africa, water drums in Central and West Africa, and the different types of ngoma drums (or engoma) in Central and Southern Africa. Other percussion instruments include many rattles and shakers, such as the kosika (kashaka), rain stick, bells and wood sticks. Also, Africa has many other types of drums, and many flutes and stringed and wind instruments.

The playing of polyrhythms is one of the most universal characteristics of Sub-Saharan music, in contrast to polyphony in Western music. Several uniquely designed instruments have evolved there over time to facilitate the playing of simultaneous contrasting rhythms. The mbira, kalimba, Kora, Ngoni and dousn'gouni are examples of these instruments which organize notes not in the usual single linear order from bass to treble, but in two separated rank arrays which allows additional ease in playing cross rhythms. The continuing influence of this principle can be seen in the 20th century American instruments the gravi-kora and gravikord which are new modern examples.

Relationship to language 
Many languages spoken in Africa are tonal languages, leading to a close connection between music and language in some local cultures. These particular communities use vocal sounds and movements with their music as well. In singing, the tonal pattern or the text puts some constraints on the melodic patterns. On the other hand, in instrumental music a native speaker of a language can often perceive a text or texts in the music. This effect also forms the basis of drum languages (talking drums).

Influences on African music 

Historically, several factors have influenced the traditional music of Africa. The music has been influenced by language, the environment, a variety of cultures, politics, and population movement, all of which are intermingled. Each African group evolved in a different area of the continent, which means that they ate different foods, faced different weather conditions, and came in contact with different groups than other societies did. Each group moved at different rates and to different places than others, and thus each was influenced by different people and circumstances. Furthermore, each society did not necessarily operate under the same government, which also significantly influenced their music styles.

Influence on North American music 

African music has been a major factor in the shaping of what we know today as Dixieland, the blues, and jazz. These styles have all borrowed from African rhythms and sounds, brought over the Atlantic Ocean by enslaved Africans. African music in Sub-Saharan Africa is mostly upbeat polyrhythmic and joyful, whereas the blues should be viewed as an aesthetic development resulting from the conditions of slavery in the new world. The blues has likely evolved as a fusion of an African blue note scale with European twelve tone musical instruments. The musical traditions of the Irish and Scottish settlers merged with African-American musical elements to become old-time and bluegrass, among other genres.

On his album Graceland, the American folk musician Paul Simon employs African bands, rhythms and melodies as a musical backdrop for his own lyrics; especially Ladysmith Black Mambazo. In the early 1970s, Remi Kabaka, an Afro-rock avant-garde drummer, laid the initial drum patterns that created the Afro-rock sounds in bands such as Ginger Baker's Airforce, The Rolling Stones, and Steve Winwood's Traffic. He continued to work with Winwood, Paul McCartney, and Mick Jagger throughout the decade.

Certain Sub-Saharan African musical traditions also had a significant influence on such works as Disney's The Lion King and The Lion King II: Simba's Pride, which blend traditional music with Western music. Songs such as "Circle of Life" and "He Lives in You" combine of Zulu and English lyrics, as well as traditional African styles of music with more modern western styles. Additionally, the Disney film incorporates numerous words from the Bantu Swahili language. The phrase hakuna matata, for example, is an actual Swahili phrase that does in fact mean "no worries". Characters such as Simba, Kovu, and Zira are also Swahili words, meaning "lion", "scar", and "hate", respectively.

Babatunde Olatunji, Miriam Makeba and Hugh Masekela were among the earliest African performing artists to develop sizable fan bases in the United States. Non-commercial African-American radio stations promoted African music as part of their cultural and political missions in the 1960s and 1970s. African music also found eager audiences at Historically Black colleges and universities (HBCUs) and appealed particularly to activists in the civil rights and Black Power movements.

African popular music 

African popular music, like African traditional music, is vast and varied. Most contemporary genres of African popular music build on cross-pollination with western popular music. Many genres of popular music, including blues, jazz and rumba, derive to varying degrees from musical traditions from Africa, taken to the Americas by enslaved Africans. These rhythms and sounds have subsequently been adapted by newer genres like rock, soul music, and rhythm and blues. Similarly, African popular music has adopted elements, particularly the musical instruments and recording studio techniques of western music.

In West Africa, Fela Kuti and Tony Allen performed Afrobeat music. Femi Kuti and Seun Kuti followed their father Fela Kuti. One of the most important 20th century singers of South African popular music was Miriam Makeba, who played a key-role, in the 60s, in drawing global audience's attention to African music and its meaning. Zenzile Miriam Makeba was said to have been one of the most influential and popular musicians of Africa, beginning in the 1950s. She was a part of three bands, including one all-woman band and two others. She performed all types of jazz music, traditional African music, and music that was popular in Western Africa at the time. Miriam played a majority of her music in the form of "mbube", which was "a style of vocal harmony which drew on American jazz, ragtime, and Anglican church hymns, as well as indigenous styles of music." After she moved to the U.S., problems with Makeba's passport occurred and she had to stay in America, it was said that she put an American twist on most of her African music. She had a very diverse scale of her vocal range and could hit almost any note. "The Empress of African Music" died at the age of 76.

The Afro-Euro hybrid style, the Cuban son, has had an influence on certain popular music in Africa. Some of the first guitar bands on the continent played covers of Cuban songs. The early guitar-based bands from the Congo called their music rumba (although it was son rather than rumba-based). The Congolese style eventually evolved into what became known as soukous.

Kalpop is a music genre that originated in the Klassikan royal communities under Klassik Nation record label. Kalpop is a genre of Klassikan, African, lingual (multicultured), and popular music that originated in its modern form during the mid-1990s in Kenya and later spread to the United States and the United Kingdom. Kalpop music has found a home to a growing fan base and with a number of locally established as well as emerging Kalpop bands (there are over thirteen active local Kalpop bands in Nairobi alone) further cementing this genre by engaging in different as well as mutually organised Kalpop themed events. DON SANTO, Badman Killa, Blessed Paul, Cash B, Jay Nuclear, Rekless, G-Youts (Washu B and Nicki Mulla), Sleek Whizz, Chizei, are among the many artists playing Kalpop music in Kenya.

Music industry 
For African artists, concerts were the one of the few ways to earn in the industry. Piracy and changing consumer behavior are behind declining sales of records. Enforcement of copyright law remains weak in Africa. MusikBi is the first legal music download website in Africa. It does not offer streaming and is limited by internet speeds in Africa. African countries (Kenya, Gambia and South Africa) have seen protest over airtime given to American music. In Zimbabwe 75% of airtime has to be given to local music. Protective actions have seen the growth of new genres like Urban Grooves emerge in Zimbabwe. In 2016 Sony Music launched in Africa by opening an office in Nigeria. Traditionally services of western major international studios have not been available in Africa, the local demand for their music being met through piracy.

See also 

 African heavy metal
 African popular music
 Victor Kofi Agawu
 Paul Berliner
 Ian Brennan (music producer)
 Clave (rhythm)
 Gravikord
 International Library of African Music
 Arthur Morris Jones
 Ashenafi Kebede
 Gerhard Kubik
 List of African guitarists
 Mine bengidzakiwe
 Polyrhythm
 Hugh Tracey
 Traditional sub-Saharan African harmony
 World music

References

Further reading 
 Graeme Ewens. Africa O-Yé: a Celebration of African Music. 1992, cop. 1991. New York: Da Capo Press. 
 Ruth M. Stone, ed. The Garland handbook of African Music 2nd edn, 2008. NY & Oxford: Routledge.  (Abridged paperback edition of vol."Africa", vol. 1 of The Garland Encyclopedia of World Music with additional articles)
 Rhythms of the Continent from the BBC
 International Library of African Music at Rhodes University
 Recordings of African music from the British Library's collections

External links 

 Glossary of African music styles
 Historical Notes on African Melodies
 
 Lecture on music and politics in contemporary Mali
 African music industry can spark billions worth of investments